Termen'-Elga (also Терменьелга, Терменъелга; , Tirmänyılğa) — river in Ishimbay. There is a ponds. First built for oil workers, its  volume 520 м³, surface area 0,17  км². Second pond built for sanatorium "Chaika" ("Чайка", literally "Gull"). 

Ishimbay
Rivers of Bashkortostan